Ugolnoye is a rural locality (a selo) in Raychikhinsk city urban okrug, Amur Oblast, Russia. The population was 41 as of 2018. There are 3 streets.

Geography 
The village is a satellite town of Raychikhinsk.

References 

Rural localities in Raychikhinsk Urban Okrug